The Independence Party of Minnesota (often abbreviated IPM, MNIP or IP), formerly the Reform Party of Minnesota, is a political party in the U.S. state of Minnesota. It was the party of former Minnesota governor Jesse Ventura (1999–2003).

Originally an affiliate of the Reform Party of the United States of America, the IPM was later affiliated with the Independence Party of America, for a time had no national affiliation, but since 2019 has joined the Alliance Party. The party has fielded candidates for most statewide races and was considered a major party by the state from 1994 to 2014. It lost that status when none of its statewide candidates won 5% of the vote in the 2014 gubernatorial election.

The party, which was represented in the U.S. Senate by Dean Barkley in 2002–2003, nominated former U.S. Representative Tim Penny as its candidate in the 2002 gubernatorial election, Peter Hutchinson in 2006 and Tom Horner in 2010.

Despite its name, the IPM does not advocate secession from the United States.

History
The party was formed in 1992 by Minnesota supporters of Ross Perot, and fielded Dean Barkley that year as a candidate for a seat in the US House of Representatives. Other supporters led by Don Dow, State Director, and Victoria Staten, Assistant State Director and Ross Perot's spokesperson on NAFTA, worked as part of United We Stand America, and some eventually found their way to the Independence Party after the elections. Over the following years, the party began to field candidates in other state races. In 1995 the IPM affiliated with the national Reform Party and renamed itself the Reform Party of Minnesota on June 22, 1996.

The state party carried that name until it disaffiliated from the national party in 2000 due to factional dissent and the increasing influence of Pat Buchanan within the party. The party immediately changed its name back to Independence Party on March 4, 2000. After his most influential opponents left the party, Buchanan went on to become the Reform Party's candidate for president.

On 2004's Super Tuesday, March 2, the party held caucuses around the state along with Minnesota's other three parties. Since the organization had no national party affiliation, it merely ran a straw poll to gauge the opinions of members with regard to the available presidential candidates in the 2004 election. For the poll, the group used instant-runoff voting, a voting method that has been gaining interest in the state. Additionally, the party had several fairly progressive agenda items to vote on. For a bit of levity, there was also a vote on the mascot to use for the party. Three top possibilities were the bison, hawk, and white buffalo. Technology was also involved in the IPM's caucusing, as it used the Internet to conduct a two-day online "virtual caucus" for people who were unable to attend the evening of Super Tuesday.

On March 5, 2004, the party announced that the presidential winner was John Edwards, who had privately circulated his decision to withdraw shortly before IP members voted. The Super Tuesday ballot was probably the first statewide experiment in instant-runoff voting. The Bison, to be named Indy, won the mascot vote, out-polling the nearest competitors by a 19% margin.

In May 2005, Peter Hutchinson, who was Minnesota Finance Commissioner in the Rudy Perpich administration, announced that he was planning to seek the Independence Party's nomination for governor in the 2006 election. Hutchinson finished 3rd of 6 earning 141,735 votes for 6.4% of the total vote.

As of 2006, the party has had two members in the Minnesota Senate. Bob Lessard of International Falls, joined the party in 2001 after he was re-elected to the Senate as an independent with 54.3% of the vote. He did not seek re-election in 2002. Also in the 2002 election, Sheila Kiscaden of Rochester was turned down for endorsement for re-election to the Minnesota Senate by the Republican Party. She joined the IP and won re-election, giving the Independence Party its first victory in a Minnesota legislative election. She joined the Democratic-Farmer-Labor Party in January 2006. There have been no members of the IPM in the Minnesota House of Representatives.

In the 2006 elections IP 5th district congressional candidate Tammy Lee received 51,456 votes for 21.01% of the total vote. Lee's strong showing resulted in part from her unusually strong (for third parties) fundraising, Lee raised $228,938  for her run.

In May 2008, a "Draft Dean Barkley" movement started on the web to encourage the former senator to run again. He accepted, and finished third, winning a significant 15% of all votes cast. His candidacy had a significant impact on a race in which the eventual winner Al Franken and then-incumbent Senator Norm Coleman were separated by only 312 votes. Two other federal candidates, David Dillon in the 3rd congressional district and Bob Anderson in the 6th congressional district, received 10% of the vote in their races. 2008 is the high-water mark for the Minnesota Independence Party in both the number of federal candidates running and the percent of vote received—both key measures of the base of support.

In 2010 gubernatorial candidate Tom Horner, a former public relations executive and chief of staff to U.S. Senator David Durenberger received 12% of the vote, nearly doubling the total of previous IP gubernatorial candidate Peter Hutchinson. Horner polled as high as 18% in the weeks leading up to the election, but was significantly outspent by the GOP and DFL candidates and the third-party expenditure groups supporting their candidacies. Horner did receive endorsement from three of the state's five living ex-governors: Republicans Arne Carlson and Al Quie as well as Ventura. Former U.S. Senate candidate and prominent Minnesota attorney Mike Ciresi also endorsed Horner.  Most Minnesota newspapers including the Star Tribune, St. Paul Pioneer Press, St. Cloud Times, Duluth News Tribune, and Rochester Post-Bulletin, as well as North Dakota's Grand Forks Herald endorsed the IP candidate.

In 2014, the Independence Party endorsed several candidates for state and national office: Hannah Nicollet for governor, Kevin Terrell for U.S. Senate, attorney Brandan Borgos for Minnesota Attorney General, whistleblower Pat Dean for state auditor, Bob Helland for secretary of state, John Denney for US congress CD-6, Paula Overby for US congress CD-2 and Iraq War veteran Dave Thomas for US congress CD-4.

In 2016, the party endorsed Evan McMullin, a former CIA agent and former chief policy director for the House Republican Conference, for President.

Platform
The Independence Party of Minnesota tends to lean conservative with regards to taxation and other fiscal matters. For example, "personal responsibility" is a core principle of the party as is a "[G]overnment that is fiscally responsible: equitable in its collection of taxes, careful in its spending, and honest in its financial reporting."  Many IP candidates have campaigned for tax reform that produces more stable revenues for the state. The IP platform states, "We support government budgets that are structurally balanced and avoid shifting of expenses or borrowing to make them appear balanced."
  
In social policy the party tends to take more liberal-libertarian positions on issues such as abortion, gay marriage, and civil rights and liberties.  One of its core principles is that "All citizens deserve equal rights, protection, and opportunity under the law. In our party and public affairs, we are ever vigilant to promote only those rules and laws which assure equity and freedom for all citizens." 

Jesse Ventura described the party, as well as his own personal philosophy, as "fiscally conservative and socially liberal."

At the party's state convention in 2012, delegates passed three new resolutions. One addressed the party's opposition to raiding dedicated state funds to balance general obligations. A second expressed frustration with the overuse of constitutional amendments. A third proposed eliminating legislative pay in the event of a state shutdown like the one that occurred in the summer of 2011. Party delegates also adopted two standing resolutions against both the marriage amendment and the voter ID amendment on the state ballot in November 2012.

During the 2013 IP convention the body amended the party platform to support the legalization, taxation and regulation of marijuana. Delegates also lifted the party's prohibition on receiving money from political action committees, citing the need to instead fight for transparency and accountability in Minnesota campaign spending in the aftermath of Citizens United.

Partners
The Independence Party of Minnesota joined the Minnesotans United for All Families coalition in 2011 after chair Mark Jenkins announced the party's official opposition to the marriage amendment, citing the party's own platform in its opposition.

The IP is also a longtime supporter of ranked choice voting (RCV) and FairVote Minnesota, which seeks to expand RCV throughout Minnesota. The party uses RCV to conduct intraparty endorsements including delegates' decision to "not endorse" for U.S. Senate in 2012.

Following the party's official vote to oppose the 2012 voter ID amendment, the campaign seeking to defeat the amendment, "Our Vote, Our Future", announced former IP gubernatorial candidate Tim Penny as one of its campaign co-chairs. Another former IP gubernatorial candidate, Tom Horner, was named as a member of the group's advisory committee.

On May 4, 2019, the Independence Party of Minnesota merged with Alliance Party, joining other third parties including the Modern Whig Party, the American Party of South Carolina, and the American Moderates.

Notable members
Jesse Ventura – Governor of Minnesota: 1999–2003.
Dean Barkley – U.S. Senator from Minnesota: 2002–2003 (Appointed by Gov. Ventura to fill a vacancy due to Sen. Paul Wellstone's death)
Mae Schunk – Lt. Governor of Minnesota: 1999–2003
Tim Penny – Former Democratic Congressman and 2002 Independence Party candidate for governor

Officers
Philip Fuehrer, State Chair 
Ben Thome, state director
Sally Paulsen, state treasurer
Jan Beliveau, state secretary

See also
 Politics of Minnesota
 List of political parties in Minnesota

References

External links
Independence Party of Minnesota

Classical liberal parties in the United States
Regional and state political parties in the United States
Political parties in Minnesota
Political parties established in 1992
1992 establishments in Minnesota